The Adelboden International is an annual bonspiel, or curling tournament, held at the Arena Freizeit Und Sport Adelboden in Adelboden, Switzerland. It was established in 2020 and is held as part of the World Curling Tour. The event is held in a round robin format with eight teams qualifying for the playoffs.

Despite being part of the men's tour, two women's teams have competed in the event. Team Silvana Tirinzoni competed in 2020 and Team Corrie Hürlimann competed in 2021.

Past champions

References

External links
Home Page

World Curling Tour events
Adelboden